Certified is the fourth studio album by American rapper David Banner, released on September 27, 2005 by SRC Records and Universal Records. Most of the album's production was handled by Banner. The album features guest appearances from Jadakiss, Jazze Pha, Talib Kweli, Twista and Jagged Edge, among others. The album spawned one single, "Play", which reached number seven on the US Billboard Hot 100 chart.

Critical reception

Certified garnered positive reviews from music critics who praised Banner's approach to over-the-top hip-hop stories and insightful political tracks. At Metacritic, which assigns a normalized rating out of 100 to reviews from mainstream critics, the album received an average score of 71, based on 13 reviews.

Pedro Hernandez of RapReviews gave high praise to Banner for building upon his previous material and delivered an album with solid production, balanced themes and capable guest artists, concluding that "Certified treads a fine line between keeping it real and selling units, but Banner treads that line very well. Though it is his best album to date, hopefully this is only the beginning for the game's most conscious rapper." AllMusic editor Andy Kellman said that despite the cluttered list of guest artists, the record delivers on Banner's established material with higher production values and gusto conviction, saying that "Certified certifies that Banner is as crucial to hip-hop in the early 2000s as any other MC." PopMatters Dan Nishimoto admired Banner's approach of crafting a mainstream hip-hop album that over-exaggerates tropes while delivering serious topics in disguise, saying that "Certifieds appeal lies in this tightrope act. Fully aware of his captive audience, Banner goes for broke to bring in as wide a swath as possible."

Steve Jones of USA Today praised the album's balance of both political and sex-filled tracks, saying that "It's a mix that is certified to both educate and entertain." Evan McGarvey of Stylus Magazine was lukewarm on the record, finding the production and guest artists not at the level of Banner's vision at times but said that its still able to deliver its twisted empathy, saying that, "Certified is mostly a frightening album because it’s so clearly not up to Banner’s full potential but still a dramatic cut above almost everything else." Azeem Ahmad of MusicOMH felt that the album was over-bloated with numerous songs that told the same inane stories over similar beats found in Lil Jon's discography, concluding that "There's little familiarity, too little to relate to on Certified, and I for one would rather give airtime to British talent than to try and push the likes of David Banner, whose music may be groundbreaking, but is alien to our ears."

Track listing

Charts

References

2005 albums
Albums produced by David Banner
Albums produced by Jazze Pha
Albums produced by Lil Jon
Albums produced by Mr. Collipark
David Banner albums